The Hyer—Knowles Planing Mill Chimney in Pensacola, Florida is all that remains of an 1854 steam-powered sawmill. When the Confederacy abandoned the city in 1862, all the mills were destroyed so they could not be used by the Union. The only part of the building that survived was the chimney. It is now part of Chimney Park, a wayside park along US 90. The chimney was added to the National Register of Historic Places on May 24, 2012.

References

External links
Historical Marker Database

Buildings and structures in Pensacola, Florida
National Register of Historic Places in Escambia County, Florida
Sawmills in the United States
1854 establishments in Florida